The 2018 Louisiana–Monroe Warhawks football team represented the University of Louisiana at Monroe in the 2018 NCAA Division I FBS football season. The Warhawks played their home games at Malone Stadium in Monroe, Louisiana, and competed in the West Division of the Sun Belt Conference. They were led by third-year head coach Matt Viator. They finished the regular season 6–6, 4–4 in Sun Belt play to finish in third place in the West Division. Despite being bowl eligible, they were not invited to a bowl game.

Previous season 
The Warhawks finished the 2017 season 4–8, 4–4 in Sun Belt play to finish in a three–way tie for fifth place.

Preseason

Award watch lists
Listed in the order that they were released

Sun Belt coaches poll
On July 19, 2018, the Sun Belt released their preseason coaches poll with the Warhawks predicted to finish in second place in the West Division.

Preseason All-Sun Belt Teams
The Warhawks had three players at four positions selected to the preseason all-Sun Belt teams.

Offense

1st team

Marcus Green – WR

2nd team

Caleb Evans – QB

RJ Turner – WR

Special teams

1st team

Marcus Green – KR

Roster

Schedule

The Warhawks hosted one of their four non-conference opponents, Southeastern Louisiana from the Southland Conference, and traveled to Southern Miss from Conference USA, Texas A&M from the Southeastern Conference and Ole Miss from the Southeastern Conference.

Schedule Source:

Game summaries

Southeastern Louisiana

at Southern Miss

at Texas A&M

Troy

at Georgia State

at Ole Miss

at Coastal Carolina

Texas State

Georgia Southern

at South Alabama

at Arkansas State

Louisiana

Players drafted into the NFL

References

Louisiana-Monroe
Louisiana–Monroe Warhawks football seasons
Louisiana-Monroe Warhawks football